Plotnikov 2-y is a rural locality (a khutor) in Mikhaylovka Urban Okrug, Volgograd Oblast, Russia. The population was 1,088 as of 2010. There are 22 streets.

Geography 
Plotnikov 2-y is located 56 km northeast of Mikhaylovka. Sekachi is the nearest rural locality.

References 

Rural localities in Mikhaylovka urban okrug